Frank Hiscock (September 6, 1834June 18, 1914) was a U.S. Representative and Senator from New York. He served in the United States Congress from 1877 to 1893.

Hiscock was a native of Pompey, New York, and graduated from Pompey Academy.  After studying law with his brother L. Harris Hiscock, he was admitted to the bar in 1855 and began to practice in the town of Tully.  The Hiscock brothers later relocated to Syracuse, where they founded the firm that became known as Hiscock & Barclay.

In addition to their law practice, the Hiscock brothers were active in politics.  Frank Hiscock was opposed to slavery, and successively joined the Democratic, Free Soil, and Republican parties.  He served as district attorney of Onondaga County from 1860 to 1863, and was a delegate to the 1867 state constitutional convention in 1867.  In 1872 he was a supporter of the Liberal Republican Party and its nominee for president, Horace Greeley.  In 1876, he was a delegate to the Republican National Convention.

Hiscock was elected to the United States House of Representatives in 1876, and was reelected four times.  He served in the House from March 4, 1877 to March 3, 1887, and resigned before the start of the term to which he had been reelected in 1886 because he was elected to the United States Senate in January 1887 for the term that started on March 4, 1887.  Hiscock served one term, and after it expired on March 3, 1893 he returned to practicing law in Syracuse.

Hiscock died in Syracuse on June 18, 1914, and was buried at Oakwood Cemetery in Syracuse.

Early life

Hiscock was born in Pompey, Onondaga County, New York, September 6, 1834.  He graduated from Pompey Academy and studied law with his brother L. Harris Hiscock. He was admitted to the bar in 1855 and commenced practice in Tully, Onondaga County, New York.  L. Harris Hiscock and Frank Hiscock were founders of the Syracuse firm currently known as Hiscock & Barclay.

Career
In addition to practicing law, Hiscock became involved in politics, initially as an anti-slavery Democrat, and then as a member of the Free Soil Party.  Hiscock became a Republican when the party was founded in the 1850s, and served as district attorney of Onondaga County from 1860 to 1863.  He was a member of the State constitutional convention in 1867, elected to fill the vacancy caused by the death of his brother.  In 1872 Hiscock supported Liberal Republican nominee Horace Greeley for President, and in 1876 he was a delegate to the Republican National Convention.

He was elected as a representative to the Forty-fifth and to the four succeeding Congresses and served from March 4, 1877 to March 3, 1887.  He was chairman of the House Committee on Appropriations in the (Forty-seventh Congress).  He was reelected in 1886 for the term starting March 4, 1887, but resigned in order to accept the U.S. Senate seat to which he had been elected in January, 1887.

Hiscock was elected to the United States Senate by the New York State Legislature, defeating incumbent Warner Miller and Levi P. Morton in the Republican caucus and Democrat Smith M. Weed in the vote of the full legislature.  Hiscock served from March 4, 1887 to March 3, 1893, and was chairman of the Committee on Organization, Conduct, and Expenditures of Executive Departments (Fifty-first and Fifty-second Congresses).

Hiscock was an unsuccessful candidate for reelection.  After leaving the Senate, he resumed the practice of law in Syracuse.

Death and burial
He died in Syracuse on June 18, 1914 of apoplexy.  He was interred in Oakwood Cemetery.

Family
On November 23, 1859, Hiscock married Cornelia King (1837-1908), and their children included sons Albert King Hiscock (1861-1908) and Fidelio King Hiscock (1869-1917).  Frank Hiscock and his wife also raised their nephew Frank H. Hiscock following the death of his father L. Harris Hiscock.

References

External links

1834 births
1914 deaths
Onondaga County District Attorneys
New York (state) lawyers
Politicians from Syracuse, New York
Republican Party United States senators from New York (state)
Republican Party members of the United States House of Representatives from New York (state)
Burials at Oakwood Cemetery (Syracuse, New York)
19th-century American politicians
Lawyers from Syracuse, New York
19th-century American lawyers